Oncophyllum is a genus in the orchid family, Orchidaceae, consisting of only two small species endemic to Australia, and previously classified as being in Bulbophyllum.

Description 
This genus was first described in 2001 by D. L. Jones and M. A. Clements, and "... segregated from Bulbophyllum based on tiny pseudobulbs with a small internal cavity near the apex, a single tiny bract-like leaf on each pseudobulb, single-flowered inflorescence arising from the base of a pseudobulb and small flowers with a warty ovary."
They grow in many habitats ranging from very exposed to relatively sheltered. They are pollinated by insects and are fairly easy to cultivate on a hard slab with reasonably bright light, high humidity and good ventilation, and regular watering all year.

Type species: Bulbophyllum minutissimum F.Muell.

The scientific name has been derived from the New Latin word onco, from Greek onkos (barbed hook); and phyllum ("one having (such) leaves or leaflike parts") from New Latin phyllum from Greek phyllon (leaf).

Conservation status
O. globuliforme is considered "vulnerable", but O. minutissimum is widely distributed and common in Queensland and New South Wales from the Blackdown Tableland to Bateman's Bay.

Notes

References 
Jones, D. L. & M. A. Clements. 2001. "Oncophyllum, a new genus of Orchidaceae from Australia." Orchadian  13:420–424. (Sept. 2001).
David L. Jones. A complete Guide to Native Orchids of Australia, including the island territories, p. 427.  2006. New Holland Publishers, Frenchs Forest, N.S.W. 2086 Australia. .
J.J. Vermeulen : Orchid Monographs Vol. 7 (1993), A taxonomic revision of Bulbophyllum, sections Adelopetalum, Lepanthanthe, Macrouris, Pelma, Peltopus, and Uncifera (Orchidaceae). iv + 324 pp., 25 text-figs. + 116 full-page line drawings, 6 pp. colour plates. 
 Siegerist E.S.: - Bulbophyllums and their allies - devoted solely to Bulbophyllums, it is an introductory guide for amateur and advanced orchid growers.  Pub. 2001, 77 colour photos, 296 pp

External links 
 Germplasm Resources Information Network: Taxonomy for Plants

 
Dendrobieae genera